The , commonly known as , is a standardization organization in Japan. ARIB is designated as the center of promotion of the efficient use of the radio spectrum and designated frequency change support agency. Its activities include those previously performed by the Research and Development Center for Radio Systems (RCR) and Broadcasting Technology Association (BTA).

ARIB is a participating standards organization of the Global Standards Collaboration initiative and an organizational partner of the 3rd Generation Partnership Project (3GPP).

See also 
ISDB

References 

https://www.arib.or.jp/english/arib/about_arib.html  -  Establishment of ARIB

External links 
 

ISDB
Trade associations based in Japan
Radio organizations
Standards organizations in Japan
Companies established in 1983
1983 establishments in Japan